Joseph Adams (July 13, 1779-August 23, 1850) was an American politician from Maine. Born in Wayland, Massachusetts, Adams eventually moved to Maine. As a resident of Gorham, he was a delegate to the 1819 Maine Constitutional Convention. After moving to Portland, he was elected to the Maine House of Representatives, where he was one of three who represented Portland in the 4th Legislature (1824). He died in 1850 in Providence, Rhode Island and is buried in Portland's Western Cemetery.

References

1779 births
1850 deaths
People from Wayland, Massachusetts
Politicians from Gorham, Maine
Politicians from Portland, Maine
Members of the Maine House of Representatives
Burials at Western Cemetery (Portland, Maine)